This is a list of episodes for the U.S. television program Parker Lewis Can't Lose.

Series overview
{| class="wikitable plainrowheaders" style="text-align:center"
! colspan=2| Season
! Episodes
! First aired
! Last aired
|-
| style="width:5px; background:#7fff00"|
| 1
| 26
| September 2, 1990
| May 19, 1991
|-
| bgcolor="9C380C"|
| 2
| 25
| August 11, 1991
| May 17, 1992
|-
| bgcolor="3251AE"|
| 3
| 22
| July 16, 1992
| June 13, 1993
|-
|}

Episodes

Season 1 (1990–91)

Season 2 (1991–92)

Season 3 (1992–93)

References

Parker Lewis Can't Lose